Idridgehay railway station is an intermediate station on the former Midland Railway branch line to the town of Wirksworth in Derbyshire. The line has been reopened as the Ecclesbourne Valley Railway and Idridgehay station was reopened on 8 March 2008.

History

Opened with other stations on the branch line to Wirksworth on 1 October 1867, it was designed by the Midland Railway company architect John Holloway Sanders.

Idridgehay remained open until 16 June 1947, when the Wirksworth branch passenger service was withdrawn on a temporary basis in response to postwar fuel shortages.  This was made permanent with effect from May 1949, when the line was removed from the summer timetable.  Freight facilities remained rail-served until 2 March 1964, while the branch continued to be used for mineral traffic until December 1989.

The station has been restored as an operational station on the Ecclesbourne Valley Railway in Derbyshire. The station building and nearby former station master's house have been sold off to private ownership in recent years, but the platform has been restored by volunteer members of the Ecclesbourne Valley Railway Association, culminating in its reopening to passenger-carrying trains in March 2008. The rebuilding of the adjacent level crossing with new gates and fencing was completed over the winter of 2007/8.

Stationmasters

Benjamin Tomlinson 1867 - 1884
Arthur G. Beeton 1884 - ca. 1908
H. Peat ca. 1911 - ca. 1914
G.W. Marple 1921 - 1936 (also station master at Shottle, afterwards station master at Wirksworth)
A.H. Webb 1936 - 1937  (also station master at Shottle)
A. Harrison 1937 - 1938 (also station master at Shottle, afterwards station master at Little Eaton)
W. Cooke 1938 - ???? (also station master at Shottle)

Route

See also
Listed buildings in Idridgehay and Alton

References

External links
Idridgehay website

Heritage railway stations in Derbyshire
Former Midland Railway stations
Railway stations in Great Britain opened in 1867
Railway stations in Great Britain closed in 1947
Railway stations in Great Britain opened in 2008
John Holloway Sanders railway stations